The Huawei Sonic is a low-range smartphone manufactured by Huawei. It runs Android 2.3, has a 3.2mpx camera and access to the Internet. Radio services are also provided, unlike a Nexus, with an FM radio.

Launch and availability

Asia/Pacific

Europe

Americas

Hardware

Processor 
The phone runs on a Qualcomm MSM7227 chip at 600MHZ clock speed.

Memory
The Huawei Sonic has a 256MB of RAM and a 512MB  ROM. It has a storage capacity of 160 MB. It also has a MicroSD card slot which can support up to 32 GB of storage. Huawei offers its cloud service online making this the first phone with its cloud service. With Huawei's cloud service, the phone can support up to 16 GB of storage online.

Display
The Huawei Sonic has a 3.5 inch multi-touch TFT capacitive touchscreen.

Audio
The phone has a built-in speakerphone which allows for good quality listening to music.

Camera
On the back of the phone there is a 3.2mpx camera which can also record WVGA (800x480) video recording at 16-22FPS. The camera features geo-tagging but has no support for low-light pictures as it has no flash.

Connectivity
The Huawei Sonic is the first low-range smartphone of its kind to have an NFC (optional) chip in it in its U8650NFC-1 version. The micro-USB port enables USB Mass Storage mode, meaning pictures, videos and music can be transferred on to the phone from a computer.
The phone also features a standard 3.5mm headphone jack which is located at the top of the phone.

Software
The Huawei Sonic runs Android 2.3.3 but is able to be updated to Android 2.3.5 which improves the performance, battery life and many other issues that affected Android 2.3.3.

Android version 4.0.4 is also available by recovery by the user (custom recovery required).

Reception

Variants

U8650-1
The Huawei U8650-1 is the Sonic model which doesn't have NFC

U8650NFC-1
The Huawei U8650NFC-1 is the same phone except that it also includes a NFC chip inside it making it the first low-range smartphone to include this.

U8652
The Huawei Fusion U8652 is the American version of the Sonic sold by AT&T. It has the same specs, with AT&T apps and Android 2.3.4 preinstalled. It can be bought in America prepaid or at Walmart.

C8650 ideos
The C8650 ideos is basically the same phone as U8650 but the design has been changed slightly and the amount of RAM was doubled - 512MB of RAM.

T-Mobile Prism 3G
The T-Mobile Prism 3G is another variant manufactured by Huawei for T-Mobile. It features exactly the same specifications as the original, along with T-Mobile propriety apps and will be released for $50 on a two-year contract on May 6, 2012.

References

External links
Huawei Sonic Official Website

Android (operating system) devices
Huawei smartphones
Mobile phones introduced in 2011
Discontinued smartphones